Minuscule 200 (in the Gregory-Aland numbering), ε 118 (Soden), is a Greek minuscule manuscript of the New Testament, on parchment. Palaeographically it has been assigned to the 11th century. It has marginalia.

Description 

The codex contains a complete text of the four Gospels on 229 parchment leaves (size ). The text is written in two columns per page, in 25 lines per page, in light-brown or dark-brown ink, capital letters in gold.

There is also a division according to the Ammonian Sections, whose numbers – all in gold – are given at the margin. It contains references to the Eusebian Canons in red (written below Ammonian Section numbers).

The Synaxarion and Menologion were added in the 14th century.

Text 

The Greek text of the codex is a representative of the Byzantine text-type. Aland placed it in Category V.
According to the Claremont Profile Method it represents textual cluster Π200.

The pericope John 7:53-8:11 is marked with an obelus as a doubtful.

History 

The manuscript once belonged to Antonio Corbinelli († 1423) and together with codex 199 was presented to Benedictine monastery.

It was examined by Birch, and Burgon. C. R. Gregory saw it in 1886.

It is currently housed at the Laurentian Library (Conv. Sopp. 160), at Florence.

See also 
 List of New Testament minuscules
 Biblical manuscript
 Textual criticism

References

Further reading 

 

Greek New Testament minuscules
11th-century biblical manuscripts